Romeoland is the third studio album by American rapper Lil' Romeo. It was released on September 21, 2004 on The New No Limit and Koch. Romeoland peaked at No. 70 on the US Billboard 200 and No. 29 on the Top R&B/Hip-Hop Albums chart.

Track listing

Samples
"My Cinderella" contains a sample of "If I Ever Fall in Love" by Shai
"The One" contains a sample of "Love Come Down" by Evelyn "Champagne" King

Chart positions

References

2004 albums
E1 Music albums
No Limit Records albums
Romeo Miller albums